Shani Arshad is a Pakistani  film music director, songwriter, TV jingle composer,  playback singer and record producer. He has composed music for various television serials and films including Actor in Law, Na Maloom Afraad, Load Wedding, Teefa in Trouble, and The Donkey King. Shani Arshad, as a music composer, has made 16 super hit films background score and 18 television Soundtracks , also he has directed 11 musical compositions in Coke Studio (Pakistan). Shani Arshad also made orchestral music with Hungarian orchestra "Budapest Film Orchestra" for the film The Donkey King.

Career
Shani Arshad was born in the home of musician Ustad Arshad Ali. He started his career as a keyboard player at an early age 15. He joined Eagle Record Company as a remix producer in 1998, where he was asked to make Vital Signs band's remix album, and that album was Shani's introduction to the pop industry. He has worked with well-known Pakistani musicians including Junaid Jamshed, Atif Aslam, Abida Parveen, Rahat Fateh Ali Khan, Ali Zafar, Shafqat Amanat Ali Khan, Zeb Bangash, Meesha Shafi, QB, Hadiqa Kiyani, Shehzad Roy, Fakhir, Strings, Haroon, Jimmy Attre, Raheem Shah, Najam Sheraz, Fakhar-e-Alam, Aamir Zaki, Sajjad Ali. Two times ARY Films Awards winner for best music and Two times winner for best ost and best jingle at Hum TV Awards and SEPMA. Shani also has been nominated thrice for Lux Style Awards and also twice for The Muzik Awards. He also appeared in #CokeStudio9 and #CokeStudio10 as a singer and a music producer.

Filmography
Main Hoon Shahid Afridi (2013)
Na Maloom Afraad (2014)
Jawani Phir Nahi Ani (2015)
Bin Roye (2015)
Actor in Law (2016)
Na Maloom Afraad 2 (2017)
Punjab Nahi Jaungi (2017)
7 Din Mohabbat In (2018)
Teefa in Trouble (2018)
Load Wedding (2018)
Jawani Phir Nahi Ani 2 (2018)
The Donkey King (2018)
Sherdil (2019)
Ishrat Made in China (2022)
Dum Mastam (2022)
Quaid-e-Azam Zindabad (2022)
London Nahi Jaunga (2022)

Upcoming
Money Back Guarantee
Fatman

Studio
HM Studios, Karachi

Television composer
Geo News Music ID
TV One News Music ID
Dunya News Music ID
Har Pal Geo Music ID
Geo Super Theme Song ("Jiyo Tou Aisay") (also singer)

Coke Studio Composer
Shani Arshad composed the following songs:
"Nimma Nimma" (composer and singer)
"Julie" sung by Ali Zafar
"Meri Meri" sung by Rizwan Butt and Sara Haider
"Bholay Bhhalay" Saiyan sung by Meesha Shafi 
"Maula-e-Kull" sung by Abida Parveen
"Lathay Di Chadar Uttay" sung by QB and Farhan Saeed
"Luddi Hay Jamalo" sung by Humaira Arshad and Ali Sethi
"Saddaa" sung by Rahat Fateh Ali Khan
"Maula Tera Noor" sung by Shafqat Amanat Ali
"Bol" sung by Shafqat Amanat Ali
"Aaj Rung Hai" sung by Amjad Sabri and Rahat Fateh Ali Khan (with Shani Arshad as one of the musicians)

Film songs as a singer

TV soundtracks
 Tum Mere Kya Ho
 Dayar-e-Dil
 Khwab Saraye
 Zindagi Gulzar Hai
 Mohabbat Subh Ka Sitara
 Neelum Kinarey
 Jaye Kahan Yeh Dil
 Muqabil
 Ek Thi Marium
 Meri Guriya
 Khudparast
 Koi Chand Rakh
 Ramz-e-Ishq
 Dil Ruba (Hum TV)
 Raaz-e-Ulfat
 Noor-e-Azal
 Fitoor
 Mere Apne
 Jhoom (Geo Entertainment)

Awards and recognition
 Best Music Award by ARY Film Awards for Shani Arshad for the soundtrack of Jawani Phir Nahi Ani (2015 film)

References 

Pakistani record producers
Pakistani musicians
Pakistani composers
Pakistani film score composers
Living people
Year of birth missing (living people)